Verduzco is a Spanish surname. Notable people with the surname include:

Adolfo Lugo Verduzco (1933–2022), Mexican politician and speaker
Jason Verduzco (born 1970), American football player
José Verduzco (born 1990), Mexican footballer
Mario Verduzco, American football coach